Ras-related protein Rab-23 is a protein that in humans is encoded by the RAB23 gene. Alternative splicing occurs at this gene locus and two transcript variants encoding the same protein have been identified.

Function 

RAB23 belongs to the small GTPase superfamily, Rab family. It may be involved in small GTPase mediated signal transduction and intracellular protein transportation.

RAB23 is an essential negative regulator of the Sonic hedgehog signaling pathway.  The first understanding of biological processes requiring the Rab23 gene came from 2 independent  mouse mutations in the gene   and an epistasis analysis with mutations in the mouse shh gene. These studies showed that the gene is required for normal development of the brain and spinal cord and that the morphological defects seen in mutant embryos, such as failure to close dorsal regions of the neural tube during development, appeared secondary to expansion of ventral and reduction of dorsal identities in the developing neural tube.  These same mutations implicated the RAB23 gene in development of digits and eyes.  The mouse open brain (opb) and Sonic hedgehog (Shh) genes have opposing roles in neural patterning: opb is required for dorsal cell types and Shh is required for ventral cell types in the spinal cord.

References

Further reading